U.S. Post Office is a historic post office building located at Fayetteville, Cumberland County, North Carolina. It was built between 1909 and 1911, and is a one-story, five bay, Classical Revival style brick building.  A wing was added in 1935. It housed a post office into the 1960s, after which it was used as a branch library.

It was listed on the National Register of Historic Places in 1983.

References

Fayetteville
Neoclassical architecture in North Carolina
Government buildings completed in 1911
Buildings and structures in Fayetteville, North Carolina
National Register of Historic Places in Cumberland County, North Carolina
1911 establishments in North Carolina